Buna Airfield was an aerodrome located near Buna, Papua New Guinea. Built as an emergency landing ground, it was extended during the Second World War by the Imperial Japanese. A new runway was under construction until both runways were neutralized by Allied air bombing in late 1942.

American Bombing Attacks
Buna was first subjected to American fury during the early days of 1942. A few half-hearted bombing raids by the disillusioned & discouraged Fifth Air Force's A-20, B-17, and B-25 bombers was about the worst Buna suffered. Then, in July 1942, General George C. Kenney assumed command of what was by this time, little more than a motley collection of exhausted men and exhausted planes.

Japanese Units based at Buna Airfield
2nd Kōkūtai (A6M3 Hamp, D3A2 Val)
Tainan Kōkūtai (A6M3 Hamp)

References

External links
Buna Airfield (Old Strip)
Buna Airfield (New Strip)

Transport in Papua New Guinea
Airports in Papua New Guinea
Oro Province